Bessie Jones (1887 – November 1974) was a Welsh singer featured on some of the earliest recordings of songs from London musicals. Jones began a professional opera career soon after training at the Royal College of Music. From 1913 to 1926, she was a contract singer for HMV studios, recording numerous popular songs, Welsh folksongs and musical theatre songs, and appearing on recordings of the Gilbert and Sullivan operas and several other works. She also had an oratorio and concert career and sang in BBC radio broadcasts.

Early life and career
Jones was raised in Tonypandy the daughter of John Jones, a fruiterer. Jones studied at the Royal College of Music, where she won the operatic class prize in 1910 and the Henry Leslie prize for singers in 1912. In the college's 1911 production of Cherubini's opera The Water Carrier, Jones starred alongside George Baker under the direction of Richard Temple and Sir Charles Stanford. She sang at the Proms in 1913 under Sir Henry Wood, and played Wellgunde and the Woodbird in Wagner's Ring cycle at Covent Garden under Artur Nikisch in 1914. The Manchester Guardian called her, "a new soprano with a sweet voice of considerable power."

HMV and later years

Jones was a contract singer for HMV studios from 1913 to 1926 recording popular numbers as well as Welsh folksongs in the original Welsh. Among her notable recordings was the original 1918 recording of the song "Peter Pan", Noël Coward's first lyric for the London stage, from the revue Tails Up!. This was Coward's first publicly performed song. She was one of HMV's contract singers to use the pseudonym "Madame Deering."

When HMV's earliest recordings of the Gilbert and Sullivan operas were made between 1918 and 1924 under the direction of Rupert D'Oyly Carte, Jones sang the roles of Peep-Bo in The Mikado (1918), Gianetta and Fiametta in The Gondoliers (1919), Kate in The Yeomen of the Guard (1920), Edith in The Pirates of Penzance (1921), Lady Saphir in Patience (1922), Celia in Iolanthe (1923) and Josephine in H.M.S. Pinafore (1924). Also for HMV, Jones recorded Edward German's Merrie England under the direction of the composer in 1918, and Puccini's Madame Butterfly in 1924, in which she sang Kate Pinkerton. For the same company Jones recorded less serious repertoire, including the songs "Down Zummerzet way" (by TCSterndale Bennett), "The interfering parrot" (from The Geisha), "Up there!" (by Ivor Novello), "Daddy's sweetheart" (by Liza Lehmann), and "The Mirror Song" (by Oscar Straus).

In the concert hall, Jones's repertoire included Berlioz' La damnation de Faust and Bach's St Matthew Passion. She was a pioneer broadcaster, singing on BBC radio when the organisation was still a limited company. In one performance from 1938 on a BBC radio programme in Wales, she was accompanied on the piano by her husband Edgar Jones.

Notes

References
  
 

1887 births
1974 deaths
Alumni of the Royal College of Music
Welsh operatic sopranos
20th-century Welsh women opera singers
People from Tonypandy